Brian Andrew Nichols (born 1965 in Providence, Rhode Island) is an American diplomat serving as Assistant Secretary of State for Western Hemisphere Affairs. He previously served as the United States Ambassador to Peru from 2014 until 2017, as well as the U.S. Ambassador to Zimbabwe from 2018 until 2021.

Ambassadorships
During his time at the State Department, Nichols had served as ambassadors to several countries.

Ambassador to Peru
Nichols served as the United States Ambassador to Peru from 2014 until 2017, when he was succeeded by Krishna Urs.

Ambassador to Zimbabwe
In June 2018, he was nominated to be the next U.S. Ambassador to Zimbabwe by President Donald Trump. On June 28, 2018, his nomination was confirmed in the Senate by voice vote. On July 19, 2018 Nichols presented his credentials to President Emmerson Mnangagwa.

During the George Floyd protests in the United States, Nichols was summoned by the government of Zimbabwe after U.S. Secretary Advisor Robert C. O'Brien labeled Zimbabwe as a "foreign adversary" that was fomenting the protests and threatened with retaliatory action.

In late July 2020, he was threatened with expulsion from the country and called a "thug" by the ruling party after accusations that he was helping organizers of an anti-government march against President Emmerson Mnangagwa.

Biden administration
On March 26, 2021, President Joe Biden announced his intent to nominate Nichols to serve as Assistant Secretary of State for Western Hemisphere Affairs. On September 13, 2021, his nomination was confirmed in the Senate by voice vote.

On 28 February 2023, Nichols urged Peru’s Congress to expedite early elections and Peru’s president to promptly end the country's political crisis, leading to criticism in Peru and from Mexican President Andrés Manuel López Obrador.

Honors 
 Knight Grand Cross of the Order of the Sun of Peru
Two Presidential Meritorious Service Awards
2016 Charles E. Cobb, Jr. Award for Initiative and Success in Trade Development

Personal life 
Nichols and his wife, Geraldine Kam, have two daughters. He speaks Spanish.

See also
List of current ambassadors of the United States

References

External links

1965 births
Place of birth missing (living people)
Living people
Tufts University alumni
African-American diplomats
United States Assistant Secretaries of State
Ambassadors of the United States to Peru
Ambassadors of the United States to Zimbabwe
Biden administration personnel
21st-century American diplomats
21st-century African-American people
20th-century African-American people